Arne Skotte (13 January 1950 – 25 December 2020) was a Swedish footballer. Skotte made 69 Allsvenskan appearances for Djurgården and scored 11 goals. He scored 51 goals for Örebro. He died on 25 December 2020.

References

1950 births
2020 deaths
Swedish footballers
Djurgårdens IF Fotboll players
Örebro SK players
Skellefteå AIK players
Association football midfielders
Allsvenskan players